Jackson Yee (born on 28 November 2000) is a Chinese actor, dancer and singer. After a talent manager discovered him at a children's talent competition, where he performed a hip-hop dance, and signed to TF Entertainment, Yee became the youngest member of the Chinese boy band TFBoys in 2013.

Yee is also a solo artist and singer. His single in 2017, Li Sao (The Lament) was named "Mandarin Song of the Year" by Billboard Radio China. He received critical acclaim for his performance in Better Days  (2019) and his 2020 film A Little Red Flower was a further success. He also won the Best New Performer Award in the 39th Hong Kong Film Awards for his first lead film role, Bei in Better Days.

Yee ranked 8th on Forbes China Celebrity 100 list in 2019, and 1st in 2020 and 2021. According to Chinese media reports, he is currently one of the most commercially valuable stars in China.

Career

2005–2012: Career beginnings, Fashion Youngster 
Yee debuted as a child star, appearing in several variety programs from 2005 to 2008.

In 2009, Yee became a member of former Chinese idol group Fashion Youngsters. He left the group in 2011.

In 2010, Yee made his acting debut in the television series Iron Pear.

In March 2012, Yee participated in Hunan TV's reality talent show Up Young and entered the top 100. Despite being eliminated, he attracted the attention of TF Entertainment and was invited to audition with the company. Prior to debuting with TFBoys, Yee released his first solo single Dream Skyscraper. He also acted in several short films and appeared in Voice of China contestant, Chang Hohsuan's music video for his self-composed single, Father.

2013–2016: TFBoys and solo activities 
Yee officially debuted as a member of TFBoys in 2013. In 2015, he voiced the main character for the Chinese dub of the animated movie The Little Prince.

In July 2016, he starred in the xianxia television series, Noble Aspirations, playing a fox demon. In November, he released his second solo single You Say. The single was produced by music producer Lee Wei Song and written by Leehom Wang. The same month, he joined the cast of the variety show Let Go of My Baby.

2017–present: Mainstream popularity 
In January 2017, Yee joined the voice cast of the animated movie GG Bond: Guarding, playing the character of a mysterious man. Yee starred as the young version of the male protagonist in historical drama Song of Phoenix. He also released his own rendition of Li Sao for the soundtrack of the drama.

In September 2017, it was announced that Yee has set up his own independent studio for his solo activities. In November, Yee released his first English language single, titled Nothing to Lose, produced by Harvey Mason Jr. while Yee participated in the lyrics writing. Five days later, he released another single titled Unpredictable, produced by David Gamson and with lyrics written by Dave Gibson. Both songs ranked number two and one respectively on the FreshAsia Music Chart.

In 2018, Yee was confirmed to join the dance-oriented variety show Street Dance of China as a captain. Yee was invited to attend the 60th Grammy Award Ceremony on 28 January 2018, held in New York as the Music Ambassador of Radio 101, a China Music Vision guest. He was also the youngest Chinese musician ever to be officially invited to the ceremony. The same month, Yee was named as one of the top 10 influential charity stars by Sina. Later in the year, it was announced that he will star in the fantasy animated film L.O.R.D: Legend of Ravaging Dynasties 2. This year, he was accepted into Beijing's prestigious Central Academy of Drama after placing first and achieving the highest score for both his college entrance examination and live audition.

In 2019, Yee made his debut in major silver screen productions in the youth romance film Better Days, based on the Chinese novel, In his youth, in her beauty, where the role won him the Best New Performer Award in the 39th Hong Kong Film Awards. The same year, he starred in the historical mystery drama The Longest Day in Chang'an. On 22 December 2019, he held his first solo concert, Su Er in Shanghai, China.

In 2020, Yee starred in period action drama Forward Forever. In November 2020, he released Backseat Theater, a cover album. He recreated his imaginary "backseat concert" based on his numerous journey of going back and forth between North 2nd Ring Road and Changping when he was small. His second film A Little Red Flower was in the theaters on 31 December 2020.

Yee's first war film,The Battle at Lake Changjin, was in the cinemas on 30 September 2021. He was featured in the short film, A Date with Snow and Ice, that promotes Beijing Winter Olympic Torch Relay with Eileen Gu.

Other ventures

Philanthropy 
In June 2017, Yee was chosen as one of the WHO China Tobacco Control Champion by the World Health Organization.

In September 2017, Yee called for preserving and protecting the historic sites, and to stop uncivilized actions on cultural relics and monuments. He was named ambassador of the China Foundation for Cultural Heritage Conservation's Great Wall Charity Campaign Guardian of the Great Wall.

In November 2017, Yee was invited by the World Health Organization to Geneva as one of the four youth leaders from China, to give a speech a calling for the elimination of AIDS discrimination. Shortly after, he was awarded the title of WHO China Special Envoy For Health. As the special envoy for WHO in China, he naturally put an emphasis on healthy living, and also mentioned his support for the Children's Companion Program, a project that aims to help children in rural provinces whose parents have moved away to work in major cities. The same month, he collaborated with 16 other celebrities on the song Embracing You, which serves as the theme song for 30th World AIDS Day.

On his birthday concert held on 28 November 2017, Yee announced the establishment of the Jackson Yee Fund. Its first phase will help raise 1.5 million yuan ($227,000) to support a charity program for the China Foundation for Poverty Alleviation to help more than 12,000 rural, "left-behind" children, whose parents have moved to urban areas to earn a living with temporary jobs.

In 2019, Yee represented China at the United Nations Economic and Social Council (ECOSOC) Youth Forum. Joined by nearly 1,000 other youth advocates in New York on 8 and 9 April, he met with government ministers and officials to advance the role of young people in the implementation of the 2030 Agenda for Sustainable Development. Using the phrase Yi qi lai ba!, Yee launched a new collaboration with WHO China encouraging young people to join together to choose active, healthy lifestyles.

On 9 November 2019, Yee was announced as the China Forest Fire Management Charity Ambassador to promote the awareness of forest fires - prevent forest fires and protect our green homes.⁣

In July 2021, Yee donated 1 million to Red Cross Society of China Zhengzhou Branch plus another 1 million to Han Hong Love Charity Foundation to relieve the damages done in 2021 Henan floods.

Endorsements 
To see his band's endorsements, please visit TFBOYS

In August 2019, Yee ended his contracts with Givenchy after the brand produced a T-shirt listing Hong Kong, Macau and Taiwan as separate countries.

In March 2021, Yee distanced himself with Adidas after the brand announced its decision to not use cotton sourced from the Xinjiang region where there were alleged human rights issues.

On 28 July 2021, Yee was announced as the Nescafé brand ambassador as they shared the same attitude of "dare to think and act".

Fashion 
On 5 April 2021, Armani beauty has announced Yee as its new global makeup and skincare ambassador where he has been the ambassador for Giorgio Armani makeup for China since January 2020 and an Emporio Armani global ambassador since August 2020. “Jackson Yee really has a voice in China,” Véronique Gautier, global president of Armani Beauty, told WWD. She said he also resonates with young people and his human engagement echoes that of Giorgio Armani. On 19 January 2022, Armani beauty announced Yee as Giorgio Armani's Global Beauty Ambassador, adding fragrance to his existing roles on makeup and skincare.

On 16 April 2021, Yee was promoted to Tiffany & Co.’s global ambassador as his endorsement of the brand at a regional level in China since his appointment June 2020 has "generated impressive levels of social media fan growth and consumer engagement that well exceeded our expectations,” said CEO Alessandro Bogliolo.

Discography

Singles

EP

Album

Filmography

Film

Television series

Web series

Variety show

Music video appearances

Awards and nominations

Forbes

Notes

References

External links

 
Jackson Yee on Instagram
 

1998 births
Living people
Child pop musicians
Chinese child singers
Chinese Mandopop singers
Chinese male child actors
Chinese male film actors
Chinese male television actors
21st-century Chinese male actors
People from Huaihua
Singers from Hunan
Male actors from Hunan
Chinese idols
21st-century Chinese male singers